Raphael Meldola FRS (19 July 1849 – 16 November 1915) was a British chemist and entomologist. He was Professor of Organic Chemistry in the University of London, 1912–15.

Life 
Born in Islington, London, he was descended from Raphael Meldola (1754–1828), a theologian who was acting minister of the Spanish and Portuguese Jews in London, 1804. Meldola was the only son of Samuel Meldola; married (1886) Ella Frederica, daughter of Maurice Davis of London. He was educated in chemistry at the Royal College of Chemistry, London. There is a portrait of Meldola (oil on canvas) by Solomon J. Solomon in the Royal Society collection; also a photograph by Maull & Fox, visiting card size.

Career 
Meldola worked in the private laboratory of John Stenhouse (FRS 1848). He was appointed Lecturer, Royal College of Science (1872) and assisted Norman Lockyer with spectroscopy. Meldola was in charge of the British Eclipse Expedition to the Nicobar Islands (1875) and was Professor of Chemistry, Technical College, Finsbury (1885). He was also an entomologist and natural historian.

Meldola was a member of many scientific societies: Fellow of the Royal Astronomical Society; Fellow of the Institute of Chemistry; Fellow of the Chemical Society (London and Berlin); Member of the Pharmaceutical Society; The Geologists Association; The Royal Anthropological Institute; Entomological Society of London.
He was elected Fellow of the Royal Society in 1886 (Charles Darwin was one of his proposers), awarded the Davy Medal in 1913, and was Vice-President of the Council from 1914–1915.

Meldola was President of the Entomological Society, 1895–1897; the Chemical Society, 1905–1907; Society of Dyers and Colourists, 1907–1910; Society of Chemical Industry 1908-1909; Institute of Chemistry, 1912–1915. He was the first president of the Maccabaeans, 1891–1915. In his honour the Royal Society of Chemistry award the Meldola medal each year.

Mimicry 

Meldola was a keen naturalist, spending five years eagerly collecting evidence on mimicry in butterflies, inspired by Charles Darwin's On the Origin of Species. His work provided evidence for natural selection, acknowledged by the evolutionary zoologist Edward Bagnall Poulton in his book The Colours of Animals and thanked by Darwin for information on hexadactyly (a rare case of a person having six digits on each limb).

Inventions 
He discovered the synthetic dye Meldola's Blue.

Notes

References

External links
 
 

1849 births
1915 deaths
People from Islington (district)
Fellows of the Royal Society
British people of Italian-Jewish descent
British entomologists
British chemists
Jewish chemists
Spanish and Portuguese Jews